S2P may refer to:

Biochemistry
 Membrane-bound transcription factor peptidase, site 2, an enzyme

Computing
S2P File Format, a Touchstone File format for 2-port S-parameters
, a complexity class expressing "symmetric alternation"
Microsoft Surface Pro 2, a Surface-series Windows 8 tablet

UK Pensions
 State Second Pension